Shah Mansur Lahiji was an Iranian military commander of the Kia'i dynasty. His surname "Lahiji" implies that he was a native of Lahijan, and thus probably of Gilaki origin. He is first mentioned during the reign of Khan Ahmad Khan (r. 1538-1592), where he served as the military commander of Lahijan and also as the governor of Kuchesfahan, which was claimed by its original ruler Amira Sasan. On June 1567, Shah Mansur Lahiji inflicted a heavy defeat on Amira Sasan near Siah-rudbar, making him and his men rout. Shah Mansur Lahiji thereafter disappears from mention.

Sources
 

16th-century deaths
Year of birth unknown
16th-century Iranian military personnel
People from Lahijan
Gilaki people